Balkaya (literally "honey rock" in Turkish) may refer to the following places in Turkey:

 Balkaya, Gündoğmuş, a village in the district of Gündoğmuş, Antalya Province
 Balkaya, İliç
 Balkaya, Sapanca, a village in the district of Sapanca, Sakarya Province
 Balkaya, Şenkaya
 Balkaya, Sincik, a village in the district of Sincik, Adıyaman Province
 Balkaya, Sungurlu